Farrukh Dustov who was second seed at the tournament was the defending champion, but lost in the first round to Luke Bambridge.

Teymuraz Gabashvili won the tournament defeating Yuki Bhambri in the final, 6–3, 6–1.

Seeds

Draw

Finals

Top half

Bottom half

References
 Main Draw
 Qualifying Draw

2015 ATP Challenger Tour
2015 Singles